The 1931 All-Ireland Minor Football Championship was the third staging of the All-Ireland Minor Football Championship, the Gaelic Athletic Association's premier inter-county Gaelic football tournament for boys under the age of 18.

Dublin entered the championship as defending champions, however, they were beaten by Louth in the Leinster quarter-final.

On 20 September 1931, Kerry won the championship following a 3-4 to 0-4 defeat of Louth in the All-Ireland final. This was their first All-Ireland title.

Results

Leinster Minor Football Championship

Ulster Minor Football Championship

Connacht Minor Football Championship

Munster Minor Football Championship

All-Ireland Minor Football Championship

Semi-Finals

Kerry v Mayo
Louth v Tyrone

Final

References

1929
All-Ireland Minor Football Championship